Husne Ara Shahed was a Bangladeshi author and educationist.

Biography
She was former principal of Sher-e-Bangla Balika Mahavidyalaya in Dhaka.

Ara was married to A. F. Shahed Ali. They have two sons and one daughter. Her son Faheem Hasan Shahed is an academic.

She was a trustee of Gono University.

Bibliography

Books
Her story Sarojinir Chhabi is taught as a text in Department of Modern Indian Languages & Literary Studies (Bengali), University of Delhi.

Edited books
 Dhaka University in the Nineties, Unforgettable Dhaka University, published by Dhaka University Alumni Association, in February 2006.
 মুক্তিযুদ্ধের শতগল্প (in Bengali) (Hundred stories of Liberation war) published by Globe library in 2001.

Articles and short stories

Awards 
Shahed received many awards.
 Award of Bangladesh Lekhika Songho (1998)
 Special Awards from Dhaka University Philosophy Department Alumni Association (2012)

Death
Shahed died on 7 July 2022 in Dhaka.

See also
 Tahmima Anam
 List of Muslim writers and poets

References

External links
 Jibon Theke by Husne Ara Shahed.
 Books of Husne Ara Shahed in Bengali.
 Husne Ara Shahed in Google Books

1943 births
2022 deaths
Bangladeshi women novelists
21st-century Bangladeshi women writers
Writers from Dhaka
University of Dhaka alumni
People from Lakshmipur District